Walnut Street Historic District may refer to:

in the United States
(by state)
 Walnut Street Historic District (Florence, Alabama), listed on the National Register of Historic Places (NRHP) in Lauderdale County, Alabama
 Walnut Street Historic District (Rogers, Arkansas), listed on the NRHP in Benton County, Arkansas
 South Walnut Street Historic District (Greensboro, Georgia), listed on the NRHP in Greene County, Georgia
 West Walnut Street Historic District, Carbondale, Illinois, listed on the NRHP in Jackson County, Illinois
 South Walnut Street Historic District (Edinburgh, Indiana), listed on the NRHP in Johnson County, Indiana
 Walnut Street Historic District (Muncie, Indiana), listed on the NRHP in Delaware County, Indiana
 Walnut Street Historic District (North Vernon, Indiana), listed on the NRHP in Jennings County, Indiana
 Walnut Street Historic District (Waterloo, Iowa), listed on the NRHP in Black Hawk County, Iowa
 Walnut Street Historic District (Springfield, Kentucky), listed on the NRHP in Washington County, Kentucky
 Walnut Street Historic District (Chaska, Minnesota), listed on the NRHP in Carver County, Minnesota
 Walnut Street Historic District (Augusta, Missouri), listed on the NRHP in St. Charles County, Missouri
 Walnut Street Warehouse and Commercial Historic District, Kansas City, Missouri, listed on the NRHP in Jackson County, Missouri
 Walnut Street Historic District (Springfield, Missouri), listed on the NRHP in Greene County, Missouri
 Walnut Street Commercial Historic District, Springfield, Missouri, listed on the NRHP in Greene County, Missouri
 West Walnut Street Commercial Historic District, Springfield, Missouri, listed on the NRHP in Greene County, Missouri
 Walnut Street Historic District (Oneonta, New York), listed on the NRHP in Otsego County, New York